The spangled honeyeater (Melipotes ater) is a species of bird in the family Meliphagidae.
It is endemic to the Huon Peninsula (Papua New Guinea).

Its natural habitat is subtropical or tropical moist montane forests.

References

Melipotes
Birds of the Huon Peninsula
Birds described in 1911
Taxonomy articles created by Polbot